Léon Bence (18 January 1929 – 13 May 1987) was a French physician.

1929 births
1987 deaths
20th-century French physicians